Urophora ivannikovi is a species of tephritid or fruit flies in the genus Urophora of the family Tephritidae.

Distribution
Kazakhstan.

References

Urophora
Insects described in 1996
Diptera of Asia